Oued Heimer is a mining town in Jerada Province, Oriental, Morocco. It is located 31 km south of Oujda and 17 km west of Touissit.

According to the 2004 census it has a population of 1997.

References

Populated places in Jerada Province